The 2018–19 Los Angeles Clippers season was the 49th season of the franchise in the National Basketball Association (NBA), their 41st season in Southern California, and their 35th season in Los Angeles.

For the first time since the 2014–15 season, Austin Rivers was not on the roster following a trade to the Washington Wizards in exchange for Marcin Gortat, ending the father-son duo with his father, Doc Rivers. Additionally, longtime center DeAndre Jordan opted out of his contract with the Clippers, and became a free agent. On July 6, 2018, he signed a one-year deal with the Dallas Mavericks.

In their first full season without stars Chris Paul, Blake Griffin, and DeAndre Jordan, the Clippers still produced a winning season by March 19, and clinched a playoff berth on March 26, 2019, following a victory over the Minnesota Timberwolves.

In the playoffs, the Clippers faced the defending two-time NBA champion Golden State Warriors in the First Round, losing in six games. The two teams previously met in the 2014 playoffs, in which the Clippers won in seven games amidst a scandal surrounding former owner Donald Sterling. They were the first team since the 2016 playoffs to beat the Warriors twice on the road.

In Game 2 of the First Round, the Clippers set an NBA record for the largest comeback in playoff history, overcoming a 31-point deficit in the third quarter, en route to defeating the Warriors 135–131 to tie the series 1–1.

Draft

Roster

<noinclude>

Roster notes
 Forward Luc Mbah a Moute was on his second tour of duty with the Clippers.  Played in only 4 games before getting a knee injury and was eventually waived.  He previously played for the team from 2015 to 2017.  
 Center Ivica Zubac is the 29th former Lakers player to play for the Clippers and only the second time it occurred through a direct trade between the two teams since 1983.

Standings

Division

By Conference

Game log

Preseason 

|- style="background:#bfb;"
| 1
| September 30
| Sydney
| 
| Tobias Harris (20)
| Tobias Harris (11)
| Beverley, Gallinari, Harris (5)
| Stan Sheriff Center6,911
| 1–0
|- style="background:#bfb;"
| 2
| October 3
| Minnesota
| 
| Tobias Harris (23)
| Gallinari, Harris, Wallace, Harrell (6)
| Beverley, Gilgeous-Alexander (5)
| Staples Center10,099
| 2–0
|- style="background:#bfb;"
| 3
| October 6
| @ L.A. Lakers
| 
| Lou Williams (19)
| Marcin Gortat (9)
| Avery Bradley (4)
| Honda Center18,040
| 3–0
|- style="background:#bfb;"
| 4
| October 9
| Denver
| 
| Danilo Gallinari (16)
| Boban Marjanovic (12)
| Lou Williams (5)
| Staples Center10,187
| 4–0
|- style="background:#bfb;"
| 5
| October 11
| Maccabi
| 
| Boban Marjanovic (18)
| Boban Marjanovic (12)
| Shai Gilgeous-Alexander (7)
| Staples Center8,056
| 5–0

Regular season

|- style="background:#fcc"
| 1
| October 17
| Denver
| 98–107
| Tobias Harris (19)
| Tobias Harris (10)
| Patrick Beverley (6)
| Staples Center19,068
| 0–1
|- style="background:#cfc;"
| 2
| October 19
| Oklahoma City
| 108–92
| Harris, Gallinari (26)
| Marcin Gortat (12)
| Patrick Beverley (5)
| Staples Center14,816
| 1–1
|- style="background:#cfc;"
| 3
| October 21
| Houston
| 115–112
| Tobias Harris (23)
| Danilo Gallinari (9)
| Gallinari, Gilgeous-Alexander (4)
| Staples Center16,149
| 2–1
|- style="background:#fcc;"
| 4
| October 23
| @ New Orleans
| 109–116
| Tobias Harris (26)
| Patrick Beverley (10)
| Patrick Beverley (8)
| Smoothie King Center14,625
| 2–2
|- style="background:#cfc;"
| 5
| October 26
| @ Houston
| 133–113
| Montrezl Harrell (30)
| Tobias Harris (9)
| Milos Teodosic (5)
| Toyota Center18,055
| 3–2
|- style="background:#cfc;"
| 6
| October 28
| Washington
| 136–104
| Tobias Harris (22)
| Tobias Harris (11)
| Shai Gilgeous-Alexander (7)
| Staples Center16,491
| 4–2
|- style="background:#fcc;"
| 7
| October 30
| @ Oklahoma City
| 110–128
| Danilo Gallinari (27)
| Patrick Beverley (7)
| Patrick Beverley (6)
| Chesapeake Energy Arena18,203
| 4–3

|- style="background:#fcc;"
| 8
| November 1
| @ Philadelphia
| 113–122
| Lou Williams (26)
| Boban Marjanovic (11)
| Patrick Beverley (4)
| Wells Fargo Center20,246
| 4–4
|- style="background:#cfc;"
| 9
| November 2
| @ Orlando
| 120–95
| Lou Williams (28)
| Montrezl Harrell (12)
| Mike Scott (4)
| Amway Center15,953
| 5–4
|- style="background:#cfc;"
| 10
| November 5
| Minnesota
| 120–109
| Gallinari, Harris (22)
| Tobias Harris (10)
| Lou Williams (6)
| Staples Center16,564
| 6–4
|- style="background:#fcc;"
| 11
| November 8
| @ Portland
| 105–116
| Gallinari, Williams (20)
| Tobias Harris (11)
| Lou Williams (7)
| Moda Center19,170
| 6–5
|- style="background:#cfc"
| 12
| November 10
| Milwaukee
| 128–126 (OT)
| Montrezl Harrell (26)
| Tobias Harris (11)
| Lou Williams (10)
| Staples Center17,486
| 7–5
|- style="background:#cfc;"
| 13
| November 12
| Golden State
| 121–116 (OT)
| Lou Williams (25)
| Harris, Harrell (8)
| Lou Williams (6)
| Staples Center19,068
| 8–5
|- style="background:#cfc;"
| 14
| November 15
| San Antonio
| 116–111
| Lou Williams (23)
| Tobias Harris (8)
| Harris, Harrell (5)
| Staples Center17,463
| 9–5
|- style="background:#cfc;"
| 15
| November 17
| @ Brooklyn
| 127–119
| Danilo Gallinari (28)
| Montrezl Harrell (10)
| Patrick Beverley (8)
| Barclays Center12,944
| 10–5
|- style="background:#cfc;"
| 16
| November 19
| @ Atlanta
| 127–119
| Montrezl Harrell (25)
| Montrezl Harrell (11)
| Lou Williams (11)
| State Farm Arena14,323
| 11–5
|-style="background:#fcc;"
| 17
| November 20
| @ Washington
| 118–125
| Tobias Harris (29)
| Harris, Harrell (9)
| Gallinari, Beverley (5)
| Capital One Arena14,499
| 11–6
|- style="background:#cfc;"
| 18
| November 23
| Memphis
| 112–107 (OT)
| Montrezl Harrell (22)
| Montrezl Harrell (11)
| Lou Williams (6)
| Staples Center15,418
| 12–6
|-style="background:#cfc;"
| 19
| November 25
| @ Portland
| 104–100
| Tobias Harris (34)
| Tobias Harris (11)
| Danilo Gallinari (5)
| Moda Center19,138
| 13–6
|-style="background:#cfc;"
| 20
| November 28
| Phoenix
| 115–99
| Danilo Gallinari (28)
| Boban Marjanovic (11)
| Shai Gilgeous-Alexander (6)
| Staples Center16,372
| 14–6
|- style="background:#cfc;"
| 21
| November 29
| @ Sacramento
| 133–121
| Tobias Harris (28)
| Harris, Harrell, Scott (6)
| Avery Bradley (6)
| Golden 1 Center17,583
| 15–6

|-style="background:#fcc;"
| 22
| December 2
| @ Dallas
| 110–114
| Montrezl Harrell (23)
| Montrezl Harrell (10)
| Lou Williams (8)
| American Airlines Center19,551
| 15–7
|-style="background:#cfc;"
| 23
| December 3
| @ New Orleans
| 129–126
| Tobias Harris (27)
| Marcin Gortat (12)
| Patrick Beverley (6)
| Smoothie King Center13,822
| 16–7
|-style="background:#fcc;"
| 24
| December 5
| @ Memphis
| 86–96
| Boban Marjanovic (19)
| Tobias Harris (12)
| Lou Williams (7)
| FedExForum14,144
| 16–8
|-style="background:#fcc;"
| 25
| December 8
| Miami
| 98–121
| Tobias Harris (20)
| Danilo Gallinari (10)
| Lou Williams (5)
| Staples Center17,113
| 16–9
|-style="background:#cfc;"
| 26
| December 10
| @ Phoenix
| 123–119 (OT)
| Tobias Harris (33)
| Harris, Marjanovic (8)
| Shai Gilgeous-Alexander (5)
| Talking Stick Resort Arena12,088
| 17–9
|-style="background:#fcc;"
| 27
| December 11
| Toronto
| 99–123
| Boban Marjanovic (18)
| Mike Scott (11)
| Tyrone Wallace (6)
| Staples Center17,812
| 17–10
|-style="background:#fcc;"
| 28
| December 13
| @ San Antonio
| 87–125
| Tobias Harris (17)
| Marcin Gortat (8)
| Marcin Gortat (5)
| AT&T Center18,354
| 17–11
|-style="background:#fcc;"
| 29
| December 15
| @ Oklahoma City
| 104–110
| Danilo Gallinari (28)
| Tobias Harris (9)
| Avery Bradley (4)
| Chesapeake Energy Arena18,203
| 17–12
|-style="background:#fcc;"
| 30
| December 17
| Portland
| 127–131
| Tobias Harris (39)
| Tobias Harris (11)
| Patrick Beverley (11)
| Staples Center16,030
| 17–13
|-style="background:#cfc;"
| 31
| December 20
| Dallas
| 125–121
| Danilo Gallinari (32)
| Tobias Harris (9)
| Lou Williams (8)
| Staples Center17,528
| 18–13
|-style="background:#cfc;"
| 32
| December 22
| Denver
| 132–111
| Harris, Gallinari (21)
| Danilo Gallinari (11)
| Lou Williams (7)
| Staples Center16,571
| 19–13
|-style="background:#fcc;"
| 33
| December 23
| @ Golden State
| 127–129
| Tobias Harris (32)
| Danilo Gallinari (11)
| Lou Williams (9)
| Oracle Arena19,596
| 19–14
|-style="background:#cfc;"
| 34
| December 26
| Sacramento
| 127–118
| Lou Williams (24)
| Montrezl Harrell (9)
| Lou Williams (6)
| Staples Center19,068
| 20–14
|-style="background:#cfc;"
| 35
| December 28
| @ LA Lakers
| 118–107
| Lou Williams (36)
| Gallinari, Harris (10)
| Marcin Gortat (5)
| Staples Center18,997
| 21–14
|-style="background:#fcc;"
| 36
| December 29
| San Antonio
| 111–122
| Danilo Gallinari (21)
| Danilo Gallinari (9)
| Lou Williams (7)
| Staples Center19,068
| 21–15

|-style="background:#fcc;"
| 37
| January 1
| Philadelphia
| 113–119
| Lou Williams (22)
| Montrezl Harrell (10)
| Shai Gilgeous-Alexander (5)
| Staples Center17,868
| 21–16
|-style="background:#cfc;"
| 38
| January 4
| @ Phoenix
| 121–111
| Gallinari, L. Williams (21)
| Marcin Gortat (13)
| Shai Gilgeous-Alexander (9)
| Talking Stick Resort Arena14,764
| 22–16
|-style="background:#cfc;"
| 39
| January 6
| Orlando
| 106–96
| Tobias Harris (28)
| Marcin Gortat (10)
| Marcin Gortat (6)
| Staples Center16,616
| 23–16
|-style="background:#cfc;"
| 40
| January 8
| Charlotte
| 128–109
| Lou Williams (27)
| Montrezl Harrell (11)
| Lou Williams (10)
| Staples Center15,275
| 24–16
|-style="background:#fcc;"
| 41
| January 10
| @ Denver
| 100–121
| Lou Williams (19)
| Tobias Harris (11)
| Lou Williams (5)
| Pepsi Center15,742
| 24–17
|-style="background:#fcc;"
| 42
| January 12
| Detroit
| 104–109
| Danilo Gallinari (23)
| Tobias Harris (10)
| Montrezl Harrell (6)
| Staples Center16,540
| 24–18
|-style="background:#fcc;"
| 43
| January 14
| New Orleans
| 117–121
| Montrezl Harrell (26)
| Patrick Beverley (11)
| Patrick Beverley (7)
| Staples Center15,283
| 24–19
|-style="background:#fcc;"
| 44
| January 16
| Utah
| 109–129
| Lou Williams (23)
| Montrezl Harrell (7)
| Lou Williams (6)
| Staples Center15,535
| 24–20
|-style="background:#fcc;"
| 45
| January 18
| Golden State
| 94–112
| Tobias Harris (28)
| Harris, Harrell (9)
| Shai Gilgeous-Alexander (5)
| Staples Center19,068
| 24–21
|-style="background:#cfc;"
| 46
| January 20
| @ San Antonio
| 103–95
| Tobias Harris (27)
| Patrick Beverley (12)
| Tobias Harris (9)
| AT&T Center18,354
| 25–21
|-style="background:#fcc;"
| 47
| January 22
| @ Dallas
| 98–106
| Patrick Beverley (16)
| Patrick Beverley (9)
| Lou Williams (4)
| American Airlines Center19,466
| 25–22
|-style="background:#cfc;"
| 48
| January 23
| @ Miami
| 111–99
| Tobias Harris (31)
| Marcin Gortat (8)
| Harris, L. Williams (6)
| American Airlines Arena19,600
| 26–22
|-style="background:#cfc;"
| 49
| January 25
| @ Chicago
| 106–101
| Tobias Harris (29)
| Lou Williams (10)
| Lou Williams (10)
| United Center19,354
| 27–22
|-style="background:#cfc;"
| 50
| January 27
| Sacramento
| 122–108
| Montrezl Harrell (25)
| Patrick Beverley (10)
| Lou Williams (10)
| Staples Center19,068
| 28–22
|-style="background:#fcc;"
| 51
| January 28
| Atlanta
| 118–123
| Tobias Harris (30)
| Patrick Beverley (10)
| Lou Williams (9)
| Staples Center17,382
| 28–23
|-style="background:#fcc;"
| 52
| January 31
| LA Lakers
| 120–123 (OT)
| Lou Williams (24)
| Harris, Bradley, Beverley, Harrell (8)
| Tobias Harris (8)
| Staples Center19,068
| 28–24

|-style="background:#cfc;"
| 53
| February 2
| @ Detroit
| 111–101
| Lou Williams (39)
| Boban Marjanovic (10)
| Lou Williams (9)
| Little Caesars Arena17,862
| 29–24
|-style="background:#fcc;"
| 54
| February 3
| @ Toronto
| 103–121
| Shai Gilgeous-Alexander (19)
| Boban Marjanovic (9)
| Gilgeous-Alexander, L. Williams (3)
| Scotiabank Arena19,800
| 29–25
|-style="background:#cfc;"
| 55
| February 5
| @ Charlotte
| 117–115
| Tobias Harris (34)
| Montrezl Harrell (10)
| Lou Williams (6)
| Spectrum Center14,300
| 30–25
|-style="background:#fcc;"
| 56
| February 7
| @ Indiana
| 92–116
| Montrezl Harrell (19)
| Johnathan Motley (7)
| Shai Gilgeous-Alexander (6)
| Bankers Life Fieldhouse15,756
| 30–26
|-style="background:#cfc;"
| 57
| February 9
| @ Boston
| 123–112
| Montrezl Harrell (21)
| Danilo Gallinari (10)
| Patrick Beverley (7)
| TD Garden18,624
| 31–26
|-style="background:#fcc;"
| 58
| February 11
| @ Minnesota
| 120–130
| Lou Williams (45)
| Montrezl Harrell (12)
| Beverly, Harrell (6)
| Target Center13,782
| 31–27
|-style="background:#cfc;"
| 59
| February 13
| Phoenix
| 134–107
| Lou Williams (30)
| Green, Zubac (7)
| Lou Williams (10)
| Staples Center17,703
| 32–27
|-style="background:#cfc;"
| 60
| February 22 
| @ Memphis
| 112–106
| Montrezl Harrell (30)
| Patrick Beverley (9)
| Lou Williams (8)
| FedExForum16,444
| 33–27
|-style="background:#fcc;"
| 61
| February 24
| @ Denver
| 96–123
| Lou Williams (24)
| JaMychal Green (9)
| Beverly, Gilgeous-Alexander (4)
| Pepsi Center19,956
| 33–28
|-style="background:#cfc;"
| 62
| February 25
| Dallas
| 121–112
| Montrezl Harrell (32)
| Beverly, Green, Zubac (8)
| Lou Williams (10)
| Staples Center19,068
| 34–28
|-style="background:#fcc;"
| 63
| February 27
| @ Utah
| 105–111
| Lou Williams (18)
| Patrick Beverley (10)
| Lou Williams (6)
| Vivint Smart Home Arena18,306
| 34–29

|-style="background:#cfc;"
| 64
| March 1
| @ Sacramento
| 116–109
| Landry Shamet (20)
| Ivica Zubac (8)
| Lou Williams (10)
| Golden 1 Center17,583
| 35–29
|-style="background:#cfc;"
| 65
| March 3
| N. Y. Knicks
| 128–107
| Landry Shamet (21)
| Ivica Zubac (11)
| Lou Williams (6)
| Staples Center19,068
| 36–29
|-style="background:#cfc;
| 66
| March 4
| @ LA Lakers
| 113–105
| Danilo Gallinari (23)
| Montrezl Harrell (11)
| L. Williams, Harrell (5)
| Staples Center18,997
| 37–29
|-style="background:#cfc;
| 67
| March 8
| Oklahoma City
| 118–110
| Lou Williams (40)
| JaMychal Green (9)
| Patrick Beverley (6)
| Staples Center17,915
| 38–29
|-style="background:#cfc;
| 68
| March 11
| Boston
| 140–115
| Lou Williams (34)
| Green, Zubac (7)
| Patrick Beverley (7)
| Staples Center19,068
| 39–29
|-style="background:#fcc;
| 69
| March 12
| Portland
| 104–125
| Montrezl Harrell (22)
| Ivica Zubac (16)
| Patrick Beverley (7)
| Staples Center16,686
| 39–30
|-style="background:#cfc;
| 70
| March 15
| Chicago
| 128–121
| Danilo Gallinari (27)
| Patrick Beverley (8)
| Beverly, Gilgeous-Alexander (7)
| Staples Center17,404
| 40–30
|-style="background:#cfc;
| 71
| March 17
| Brooklyn
| 119–116
| Lou Williams (25)
| Danilo Gallinari (11)
| Shai Gilgeous-Alexander (10)
| Staples Center17,247
| 41–30
|-style="background:#cfc;
| 72
| March 19
| Indiana
| 115–109
| Danilo Gallinari (24)
| Montrezl Harrell (12)
| Lou Williams (9)
| Staples Center16,043
| 42–30
|-style="background:#cfc;
| 73
| March 22
| @ Cleveland
| 110–108
| Danilo Gallinari (27)
| JaMychal Green (9)
| Lou Williams (6)
| Quicken Loans Arena19,432
| 43–30
|-style="background:#cfc;
| 74
| March 24
| @ N. Y. Knicks
| 124–113
| Lou Williams (29)
| Ivica Zubac (10)
| Shai Gilgeous-Alexander (8)
| Madison Square Garden18,263
| 44–30
|-style="background:#cfc;
| 75
| March 26
| @ Minnesota
| 122–111
| Danilo Gallinari (25)
| Danilo Gallinari (10)
| Lou Williams (7)
| Target Center13,176
| 45–30
|-style="background:#fcc;
| 76
| March 28
| @ Milwaukee
| 118–128
| Shai Gilgeous-Alexander (21)
| Gallinari, Green (8)
| Garrett Temple (5)
| Fiserv Forum17,922
| 45–31
|-style="background:#cfc;
| 77
| March 30
| Cleveland
| 132–108
| Montrezl Harrell (23)
| JaMychal Green (10)
| Shai Gilgeous-Alexander (8)
| Staples Center16,439
| 46–31
|-style="background:#cfc;
| 78
| March 31
| Memphis
| 113–96
| Danilo Gallinari (27)
| Danilo Gallinari (15)
| Danilo Gallinari (5)
| Staples Center16,740
| 47–31

|-style="background:#fcc;
| 79
| April 3 
| Houston
| 103–135
| Shai Gilgeous-Alexander (20)
| Ivica Zubac (8)
| Lou Williams (7)
| Staples Center17,593
| 47–32
|-style="background:#fcc;
| 80
| April 5
| LA Lakers
| 117–122
| Danilo Gallinari (27)
| Gilgeous-Alexander, Harrell, Zubac (8)
| Gallinari, Williams (8)
| Staples Center17,910
| 47–33
|-style="background:#fcc;
| 81
| April 7
| @ Golden State
| 104–131
| Landry Shamet (17)
| Ivica Zubac (8)
| Lou Williams (5)
| Oracle Arena19,596
| 47–34
|-style="background:#cfc;
| 82
| April 10
| Utah
| 143–137 (OT)
| Montrezl Harrell (24)
| Ivica Zubac (11)
| Patrick Beverley (6)
| Staples Center17,655
| 48–34

Playoffs

Game log

|- bgcolor=ffcccc
| 1
| April 13
| @ Golden State
| 
| Montrezl Harrell (26)
| Danilo Gallinari (8)
| Lou Williams (9)
| Oracle Arena19,596
| 0–1
|- bgcolor=ccffcc
| 2
| April 15
| @ Golden State
| 
| Lou Williams (36)
| Montrezl Harrell (10)
| Lou Williams (11)
| Oracle Arena19,596
| 1–1
|- bgcolor=ffcccc
| 3
| April 18
| Golden State
| 
| Ivica Zubac (18)
| Ivica Zubac (15)
| Lou Williams (6)
| Staples Center19,068
| 1–2
|- bgcolor=ffcccc
| 4
| April 21
| Golden State
| 
| Shai Gilgeous-Alexander (25)
| Patrick Beverley (10)
| Patrick Beverley (5)
| Staples Center19,068
| 1–3
|- bgcolor=ccffcc
| 5
| April 24
| @ Golden State
| 
| Lou Williams (33)
| Patrick Beverley (14)
| Lou Williams (10)
| Oracle Arena19,596
| 2–3
|- bgcolor=ffcccc
| 6*
| April 26
| Golden State
| 
| Danilo Gallinari (29)
| Patrick Beverley (14)
| Williams, Beverley (7)
| Staples Center19,068
| 2–4

Player statistics

Regular season

|-
| align="left"| || align="center"| PG
| 78 || 49 || 2,137 || 388 || 300 || 67 || 43 || 596
|-
| align="left"|† || align="center"| SG
| 49 || 49 || 1,463 || 131 || 96 || 27 || 16 || 400
|-
| align="left"|≠ || align="center"| SF
| 15 || 1 || 226 || 47 || 10 || 3 || 3 || 64
|-
| align="left"| || align="center"| C
| 2 || 0 || 15 || 4 || 0 || 1 || 0 || 3
|-
| align="left"| || align="center"| SF
| 68 || 68 || 2,059 || 417 || 178 || 49 || 23 || 1,346
|-
| align="left"| || align="center"| PG
| style=";"|82 || style=";"|73 || style=";"|2,174 || 232 || 270 || style=";"|96 || 45 || 889
|-
| align="left"|‡ || align="center"| C
| 47 || 43 || 751 || 261 || 65 || 6 || 24 || 233
|-
| align="left"|≠ || align="center"| PF
| 24 || 2 || 471 || 157 || 14 || 12 || 8 || 208
|-
| align="left"| || align="center"| C
| 82 || 5 || 2,158 || style=";"|535 || 162 || 71 || style=";"|110 || 1,361
|-
| align="left"|† || align="center"| PF
| 55 || 55 || 1,903 || 432 || 150 || 40 || 24 || 1,152
|-
| align="left"|† || align="center"| C
| 36 || 9 || 376 || 152 || 22 || 11 || 17 || 242
|-
| align="left"|‡ || align="center"| PF
| 4 || 0 || 61 || 7 || 2 || 1 || 1 || 20
|-
| align="left"| || align="center"| PF
| 22 || 0 || 156 || 51 || 11 || 5 || 3 || 102
|-
| align="left"| || align="center"| SG
| 33 || 0 || 320 || 41 || 19 || 11 || 3 || 112
|-
| align="left"|† || align="center"| PF
| 52 || 0 || 748 || 174 || 44 || 17 || 8 || 248
|-
| align="left"|≠ || align="center"| SG
| 25 || 23 || 694 || 56 || 58 || 13 || 2 || 273
|-
| align="left"|≠ || align="center"| SG
| 26 || 6 || 510 || 64 || 37 || 26 || 5 || 123
|-
| align="left"|‡ || align="center"| PG
| 15 || 0 || 150 || 16 || 32 || 3 || 1 || 48
|-
| align="left"| || align="center"| SG
| 64 || 1 || 313 || 44 || 18 || 14 || 7 || 62
|-
| align="left"| || align="center"| PG
| 62 || 0 || 628 || 101 || 42 || 21 || 7 || 218
|-
| align="left"| || align="center"| SG
| 75 || 1 || 1,993 || 222 || style=";"|402 || 57 || 11 || style=";"|1,498
|-
| align="left"|≠ || align="center"| C
| 26 || 25 || 524 || 200 || 38 || 10 || 24 || 244
|}
After all games.
‡Waived during the season
†Traded during the season
≠Acquired during the season

Playoffs

|-
| align="left"| || align="center"| PG
| style=";"|6 || style=";"|6 || 195 || style=";"|48 || 28 || 6 || style=";"|6 || 59
|-
| align="left"| || align="center"| SF
| 4 || 0 || 52 || 6 || 2 || 2 || 0 || 15
|-
| align="left"| || align="center"| SF
| style=";"|6 || style=";"|6 || style=";"|201 || 37 || 16 || style=";"|8 || 1 || 119
|-
| align="left"| || align="center"| PG
| style=";"|6 || style=";"|6 || 173 || 16 || 19 || 6 || 5 || 82
|-
| align="left"| || align="center"| PF
| style=";"|6 || 3 || 141 || 32 || 5 || 4 || 0 || 66
|-
| align="left"| || align="center"| C
| style=";"|6 || 0 || 158 || 33 || 13 || 3 || 4 || 110
|-
| align="left"| || align="center"| SG
| 5 || 0 || 46 || 6 || 7 || 2 || 0 || 18
|-
| align="left"| || align="center"| SG
| style=";"|6 || style=";"|6 || 174 || 12 || 10 || 6 || 0 || 46
|-
| align="left"| || align="center"| SG
| style=";"|6 || 0 || 63 || 7 || 2 || 3 || 1 || 14
|-
| align="left"| || align="center"| SG
| 4 || 0 || 12 || 4 || 0 || 1 || 0 || 5
|-
| align="left"| || align="center"| PG
| 2 || 0 || 11 || 1 || 3 || 0 || 0 || 4
|-
| align="left"| || align="center"| SG
| style=";"|6 || 0 || 176 || 17 || style=";"|46 || 5 || 1 || style=";"|130
|-
| align="left"| || align="center"| C
| 4 || 3 || 39 || 22 || 1 || 2 || 2 || 20
|}

Transactions

Trades

Free agency

Re-signed

Additions

Subtractions

References

Los Angeles Clippers seasons
Los Angeles Clippers
Los Angeles Clippers
Los Angeles Clippers
Clippers
Los Angeles Clippers